Timo Pekka Kivinen (born 8 December 1959) is a Finnish general and the Chief of Defence since 2019. Kivinen began his career as a dragoon, and was eventually promoted to Brigade Commander of the Karelia Brigade in 2011, Deputy Chief of Staff, Strategy in 2015 and Chief of Defence Command Finland in 2017.

Career
Kivinen entered military service in the Finnish Army in 1978, and completed various courses at home and abroad, including the US Army Airborne and Ranger Courses in 1983, the Infantry Captain Course and the United Nation Staff Officer Course in Sweden in 1996, the International Visitors Programme in the US in 2003, the National Defence Course in 2006, the High Command Course in 2007 and the Flag Officers and Ambassadors Course, NATO Defence College 2012. He also studied at the National War College in 1991–1993 and in the Royal College of Defence Studies in the UK in 2008. He spent his junior years at the Uusimaa Jaeger Battalion, and was deployed in the Bosnian War as Deputy Commanding Officer, Finnish Jaeger Battalion of the Stabilisation Force in Bosnia and Herzegovina (SFOR) in 1997. He also served as an Defence Attaché in Austria, Hungary and Ukraine from 1998 to 2001, and became the Commander of the Utti Jaeger Regiment. He became the Head of Department and Vice President, National Defence University from 2004 to 2007, became the Assistant Chief of Staff, Plans and Policy Division, Defence Command 2009 – 2010, Assistant Chief of Staff, Plans and Policy Division, Defence Command from 2009 to 2010, until he became the Commander of the Karelia Brigade from 2011 to 2014, became the Deputy Chief of Staff, Strategy from 2015 to 2017, became Chief of Defence Command Finland from 2017 to 2019, and became Chief of Defence on August 1, 2019.

Promotions 
  Lieutenant 1982
  First Lieutenant 1984
  Captain 1989
  Major 1992
  Lieutenant Colonel 1998
  Colonel 2004
  Brigadier General 2010
  Major General 2014
  Lieutenant General 2016
  General 2019

Honors 
 Military Merits Medal (sotilasansiomitali)
 Commander, Order of the Lion of Finland
 1st Class with Grand Star, Order of the Cross of Liberty
  NATO medal for the former Yugoslavia
 Order of the Polar Star

References 

1959 births
Living people
Finnish generals
Chiefs of Staff (Finnish Defence Forces)
People from Lappeenranta
Commanders of the Order of the Lion of Finland
Recipients of the Order of the Cross of Liberty, 1st Class with a Star
Commanders Grand Cross of the Order of the Polar Star